Zvimba East is a constituency of the National Assembly of Zimbabwe, covering the eastern part of Zvimba District. Its current Member of Parliament is Tawanda Tungamirai (ZANU–PF).

History 
Zvimba East was created for the 2008 Zimbabwean general election. Previously, Zvimba District was divided between just two constituencies, Zvimba North and Zvimba South.

List of Members of Parliament

References 

2008 establishments in Zimbabwe
Constituencies established in 2008
Parliamentary constituencies in Zimbabwe
Zvimba District